Sissy van Alebeek (born 8 February 1976 in Schijndel, North Brabant) is a professional female cyclist from the Netherlands, who won the Dutch title in 2001 and therefore was named Rotterdam Sportswoman of the Year at the end of the year.

References
 

1976 births
Living people
Dutch female cyclists
People from Schijndel
Cyclists from North Brabant